Robert Eugene "Bud" Foster Jr. (born July 28, 1959) is a retired American college football coach and former player. He currently serves as a Special Assistant to Athletics Director Whit Babcock. Following the 2006 season, he received the Frank Broyles Award, which is annually given to the top assistant coach in college football. Foster's 2005 and 2006 Hokie defenses led the nation in total defense. Foster is regarded as one of the best defensive coordinators in college football. On August 1, 2019, Foster announced he was retiring at the end of the 2019 season.

Since taking on his first coaching position at Virginia Tech in 1987, Foster coached over 50 players that were drafted in the NFL including first-round draft picks DeAngelo Hall, Kyle Fuller, Tremaine Edmunds and Terrell Edmunds; Pro Bowlers Hall, Brandon Flowers and Kam Chancellor and Super Bowl champions Chancellor, Roger Brown, Tyronne Drakeford, Cornell Brown, Pierson Prioleau and Kendall Fuller. Foster also coached former All-Americans John Engelberger, Anthony Midget, Corey Moore, Ben Taylor, Ronyell Whitaker, David Pugh, Willie Pile, Darryl Tapp, Jimmy Williams and Xavier Adibi.

Playing career
Foster went to high school in Nokomis, Illinois.  A 1981 graduate of Murray State University, Foster played strong safety and outside linebacker for the Murray State Racers from 1977 to 1980.

Coaching career

Murray State
Foster began his coaching career as a graduate assistant at Murray State in 1981, Frank Beamer's first season as the head coach.  After two years as a graduate assistant, Foster was elevated to a full-time staff position. He coached outside linebackers for three seasons before taking over the inside linebackers as well in 1986. He also served as the Racers' recruiting coordinator and worked with special teams.

Virginia Tech
Foster moved with head coach Beamer to Virginia Tech in 1987 and became the inside linebackers coach.  He then coached the outside linebackers for the next five seasons. Foster assumed responsibility for both sets of linebackers prior to the 1993 season and also took over special-teams coaching that year. The following year, he coached the inside linebackers and special teams. Foster assumed the position of co-defensive coordinator in 1995 and took over as the sole defensive coordinator in 1996.

After helping Tech to the national championship game (Sugar Bowl) in 1999, Foster was recognized as the 2000 American Football Coaches Association Defensive Coordinator of the Year. Tech's 1999 defensive unit led Division I-A in scoring defense and ranked third in both total and rushing defense.

Under Foster's coaching, the Hokies' 2001 defense proved to be one of the nation's best, ranking among the top eight teams in Division I-A in six different categories and leading the way in shutouts with four. In 2000, Foster took a defense that returned just three starters and turned it into a unit that led the Big East Conference in rushing defense, placed 16th nationally against the run and tied for third nationally in interceptions.

"Lunch pail defense"

Since the 1995 season, a battered metal lunch pail has been the symbol of Virginia Tech's blue-collar mentality on defense. Each week a list of goals is put in the lunch pail and a player is chosen to have the honor of carrying the lunch pail onto the sidelines. The Lunch Pail Defense Foundation was founded to fund academic scholarships for students from the area near Blacksburg, Virginia.

Personal life
Foster is relatives with Heath Bell.

Statistics
Foster's defenses consistently rank among the top in the nation.  Below are Virginia Tech's defensive statistics since 1995.

References

External links
 Virginia Tech profile

1959 births
Living people
American football safeties
American football linebackers
Murray State Racers football coaches
Murray State Racers football players
Virginia Tech Hokies football coaches
Players of American football from Illinois
People from Nokomis, Illinois
People from Somerset, Kentucky